Collix biokoensis is a moth in the  family Geometridae. It is found in Equatorial Guinea (Bioko).

References

Moths described in 1999
biokoensis